Miracles Take Longer is a United Kingdom drama series broadcast on ITV from January 1984 to May 1984 made by Thames Television.

The drama depicted the life and cases dealt with by a branch of the Citizens Advice Bureau.

The programme was networked at 15.30 on Mondays and Tuesdays excluding Bank Holidays and the March Budget. TVS and Central aired it on different days.

Only one series was made and was replaced by the UK soap Gems and different Australian serials around the country.

Miracles Take Longer was devised by John Kershaw. The series scriptwriters included: Robert Holmes and Johnny Byrne.

Cast

 Patsy Byrne – Betty Hackforth
 Rosemary Williams – Sue Godfrey
 Lynette Davies – Jenny Swanne
 Terence Harvey – David Lewis
 Polly Hemingway – Paula Sheardon
 Richard Warner – Barry Goodson
 Carolyn Pickles – Vicky Thomas

External links 
 

1983 British television series debuts
1984 British television series endings
1980s British drama television series
ITV television dramas
Citizens Advice
ITV soap operas
British television soap operas
Television series by Fremantle (company)
Television shows produced by Thames Television
English-language television shows